Eugenia tiumanensis is a species of plant in the family Myrtaceae. It is a tree endemic to Pulau Tioman in Peninsular Malaysia. It is threatened by the rapid development of the island into a tourist resort.

References

tiumanensis
Endemic flora of Peninsular Malaysia
Trees of Peninsular Malaysia
Vulnerable plants
Taxonomy articles created by Polbot